Embarkment (sometimes embarcation or embarkation) is the process of loading a passenger ship or an airplane with passengers or military personnel, related to and overlapping with individual boarding on aircraft and ships.

Boarding (ship)
Embarkation involves the boarding and stationing of passengers in accommodation (cabins) by staff and crew members.

Boarding (aviation)

Legal issues
The act of embarkation or disembarkation is related to various legal issues such a liability for accidents, or in relation to immigration and refugee status. Generally liability for an accident prior to embarkation or boarding, such as during a security check is considered to not be part of the embarkation system.

References

Transport safety